The Ishikawajima-Harima J3 was a Japanese turbojet aircraft engine.  It was the first jet engine designed and built in Japan after the Second World War and was used to power the Fuji T-1 trainer and as a booster engine in the Kawasaki P-2J patrol aircraft.

Design and development
Development of the J3, the first Japanese post-war jet engine, intended to power the Fuji T-1 jet trainer, was begun in 1955 by the Nippon Jet-Engine Company, with Ishikawajima-Harima Heavy Industries (IHI) being designated prime contractor in 1959.  The resulting engine was a small, simple axial-flow turbojet.

The first pre-production engine began flight testing in a Curtiss C-46 testbed in February 1960, with production deliveries beginning in April 1962.

Operational history
While the J3 was designed to power the Fuji T-1, it was not ready in time and the first version of the T-1 was powered by imported British Bristol Orpheus engine.  The J3-IHI-3 version of the engine equipped the later T-1B version.  A more powerful version of the J3, the J3-IHI-7 was used to re-engine the T-1Bs and as booster engines for the Kawasaki P-2J maritime patrol aircraft.

Variants

J3-1
 Nippon Jet-Engine Company prototype.
J3-IHI-3
Initial production version for Fuji T-1B trainer. 11.8 kN (2,645 lbf) thrust.
J3-IHI-7
More powerful version used as auxiliary engine in the P-2J and to re-engine T-1B trainers. 13.7 kN (3,080 lbf) thrust.
J3-IHI-7C for take-off.
J3-IHI-8 for take-off.
J3-IHI-FAft-fan variant, . — the later Ishikawajima-Harima F3 turbofan engine began flights in 1985.

Applications
Fuji T-1
Kawasaki P-2J

Specifications (J3-IHI-7C)

See also

References

Further reading

 
 

1960s turbojet engines
J3